Ion Cămărășescu (January 27, 1882 – March 25, 1953) was a Romanian politician.

Born in Bucharest into a family that owned large estates, he studied at the University of Paris, taking a degree in law. After returning home, he practiced law in the Bucharest bar. Cămărășescu began his political career in the Conservative Party, serving as cabinet director for Constantin G. Dissescu, Religious Affairs and Public Instruction Minister in 1906-1907. In 1908, he was a founding member of Take Ionescu's Conservative-Democratic Party. In 1914, he was named as prefect of Durostor County. After Romania entered World War I in 1916, he served as liaison to the Imperial Russian Army in Western Moldavia. After the war, he was first elected to the Assembly of Deputies in 1919, representing Durostor there until 1933. He was named Interior Minister in Ionescu's short-lived government, which lasted from December 1921 to January 1922.

Later in 1922, Cămărășescu joined the Peasants' Party. When this evolved into the National Peasants' Party in 1926, he remained part of the new formation. From 1928 to 1930, he presided over the Union of Agricultural Chambers. When the Little Entente's Economic Council was created in 1933, he was selected as head of the Romanian delegation. In 1937, he was named by the Agriculture Ministry to the Higher Economic Council, joining the Higher Agricultural Council later that year. He refused to collaborate with the National Renaissance Front royal dictatorship of King Carol II. Arrested together with other former dignitaries by the new communist regime in May 1950, he died at Sighet prison three years later, and was buried in a mass grave.

Notes

References
Constantin Grigore and Miliana Șerbu, Miniștrii de interne (1862–2007), Editura Ministerului Internelor și Reformei Administrative, Bucharest, 2007. 

1882 births
1953 deaths
Politicians from Bucharest
Conservative Party (Romania, 1880–1918) politicians
Conservative-Democratic Party politicians
National Peasants' Party politicians
Romanian Ministers of Interior
Members of the Chamber of Deputies (Romania)
Prefects of Romania
Romanian people of World War I
20th-century Romanian lawyers
University of Paris alumni
Inmates of Sighet prison
Prisoners who died in Romanian detention
Romanian people who died in prison custody
Romanian expatriates in France